The Lebanon Cup, commonly known as the Lebanese FA Cup, is a Lebanese football annual cup competition. The first edition, held in 1937, was won by Nahda. The most successful club in the competition is Ansar with 15 titles, followed by Nejmeh with seven. Ansar have also contested the most finals with 20, followed by Nejmeh with 16.

In the first FA Cup final, held on 26 June 1938, Nahda beat Hilmi-Sport 3–2 in the replay (after drawing 1–1 the first match).

Format
As well as being presented with the trophy, the winning team also qualifies for the AFC Cup. If the winners have already qualified for the AFC Cup via Lebanese Premier League, or are not entitled to play in AFC competitions for any reason, the place goes to the next highest placed finisher in the league table.

There are a total of six rounds in the competition. The competition begins in September with the first round and is contested only by 14 clubs: all 12 Lebanese Second Division clubs and two Lebanese Third Division clubs. Six winners of the first round go on to play the second round in November, with the three winners of the second round qualifying to the round of 16, as well as one winner from the first round. In this phase, played in January, all the 12 current Lebanese Premier League teams enter, bringing the total to 16 teams. Between April and May, the quarter-finals and the semi-finals are disputed, with final being contested at the Camille Chamoun Sports City Stadium in May.

Winners and finalists

Winners by year

Results by team

Media coverage
MTV Lebanon broadcasts a selection of cup matches.

See also
 Lebanese Super Cup
 Lebanese Elite Cup
 Lebanese Challenge Cup

References

Bibliography

External links
  (in Arabic)
 Lebanese FA Cup at Kooora (in Arabic)

 
FA Cup
National association football cups
Recurring sporting events established in 1938
1938 establishments in Lebanon